Giovanni Amelino-Camelia (born 14 December 1965, Naples) is an Italian physicist of the University of Naples Federico II who works on quantum gravity.

He is the first proposer of doubly special relativity, that is the idea of introducing the Planck length in physics as an observer-independent quantity, obtaining a relativistic theory (like Galileian relativity and Einstein's special relativity). The principles of doubly special relativity probably imply the loss of the notion of classical (Riemannian) spacetime; this led Amelino-Camelia to the study of non-commutative geometry as a feasible theory of quantum spacetime.
Amelino-Camelia is the initiator of "quantum-gravity phenomenology", for being the first to show that with some experiments under reach of current technology sensitivity to Planck-scale effects is feasible (see Fermi Gamma-ray Space Telescope).

References

External links
Homepage at the INFN of Rome, ITALY
Works published at arXiv.org
"Are we at the dawn of quantum-gravity phenomenology?" (1999, Slides)
Small interview at "Essential Science Indicators" (2003, with photo)
"Quantum Gravity Phenomenology" Living Reviews in Relativity (2008)

1965 births
Living people
20th-century Italian astronomers
Quantum gravity physicists
21st-century Italian astronomers